Pierre Bost (5 September 1901, Lasalle, Gard – 6 December 1975, Paris) was a French screenwriter, novelist, and journalist. Primarily a novelist until the 1940s, he was known mainly as a screenwriter after 1945, often collaborating with Jean Aurenche.

In his 1954 article Une Certaine Tendance du Cinéma Français ("A Certain Trend of French Cinema"), François Truffaut attacked the current state of French films, singling out certain screenwriters and producers. The screenwriting team of Bost and Aurenche were criticized for their style of literary adaptations in particular, which Truffaut considered old-fashioned.

The journalist Jacques-Laurent Bost was Pierre Bost's brother.

Selected filmography
 The Mondesir Heir (1940)
 The Trump Card (1942)
 La Symphonie Pastorale (1946)
 Patrie (1946)
 Devil in the Flesh (1947)
 The Seventh Door (1947)
 The Glass Castle (1950)
 God Needs Men (1950)
 The Red Inn (1951)
 Forbidden Games (1952)
 Le Rouge et le Noir (1954)
 Gervaise (1956)
 Les amitiés particulières (1964)
 The Judge and the Assassin (1976)

Bibliography

Hercule et mademoiselle, Paris, Éditions Gallimard, 1924, 218 p.
L'imbécile, Paris, Éditions Gallimard, 1924
Prétextat, Paris, Éditions Gallimard, 1925, 221 p.
Voyage de l'esclave, Paris, Éditions Marcelle Lesage, 1926, 83 p.
Crise de croissance, Paris, Éditions Gallimard, 1926, 218 p.
À la porte, Paris, Au sans pareil, 1927, 126 p.; coll. « Le Conciliabule des trente »
Faillite, Paris, Éditions Gallimard, 1928, 252 p.
Anaïs, Paris, Éditions Gallimard, 1930, 218 p.
Briançon, Grenoble, Éditions Dardelet, 1930, 96 p.
Mesdames et messieurs, Paris, Éditions Gallimard, 1931, 253 p.
Le Scandale, Paris, Éditions Gallimard, 1931, 415 p.
Faux numéros, Paris, Éditions Gallimard, 1932, 253 p.
Un grand personnage, Paris, Éditions Gallimard, 1935 (réimpr. 1961), 221 p.
Homicide par imprudence, Paris, Éditions Gallimard, 1936, 216 p.
La haute fourche, Paris, Éditions de Minuit, 1945, 77 p.
Monsieur Ladmiral va bientôt mourir, Paris, Éditions Gallimard, 1945 ; réédition 2005, coll. « L'Imaginaire », 102 p.
Porte-Malheur, Paris, Éditions Le Dilettante, (éd. or. 1932) 2009 (1re éd. 1932), 160 p.
Un an dans un tiroir, Paris, Éditions Le Dilettante, (éd. or. 1945) 2010 (1re éd. 1945), 128 p.

As co-author:

Pierre Bost, Pierre Darbon and Pierre Quet, La Puissance et la Gloire, Paris, Robert Laffont, 1952, 221 p.
Claude-André Puget and Pierre Bost, Un nommé Judas, Paris, La Table Ronde, 1956, 191 p.
Jean Aurenche, Pierre Bost, Claude Brule and Georges Neveux, Molière pour rire et pour pleurer, Paris, Presses de la Cité, 1973, 258 p.

References

External links

People from Gard
1901 births
1975 deaths
French male screenwriters
20th-century French screenwriters
20th-century French novelists
20th-century French male writers
French male novelists
Prix Interallié winners
20th-century French dramatists and playwrights